Donald Selvyn Adolphus FitzRitson (born 26 August 1903) served as the Chief Commissioner of the Scout Association of Jamaica.

In 1973, FitzRitson was awarded the 78th Bronze Wolf, the only distinction of the World Organization of the Scout Movement, awarded by the World Scout Committee for exceptional services to world Scouting.

On 16 March 1974, his son Paul FitzRitson, a Kingston attorney and the executive chairman of National Sports Ltd., was the victim of a high-profile murder.

References

External links

Recipients of the Bronze Wolf Award
1903 births
Year of death missing
Scouting and Guiding in Jamaica
People from Trelawny Parish